Metallocarboxypeptidase D (carboxypeptidase D (cattle, human, mouse, rat), gp180 (duck)) is an enzyme. This enzyme catalyses the following chemical reaction

 Releases C-terminal Arg and Lys from polypeptides

This enzyme is activated by Co2+, and inhibited by guanidinoethylmercaptosuccinic acid.

References

External links 
 

EC 3.4.17